Al-Karābilah is a subdistrict in the west of the Al Anbar Governorate of Iraq, beside the Syrian border in an area of high ground. Its seat is the city of the Al-Karābilah. Agriculture is the main industry in the subdistrict.

Al-Karābilah town
Al-Karābilah is an Iraqi border town and center of the Al-Karābilah subdistrict, located 5–7 km from Iraqi-Syrian borders. Its population is roughly 25,000 inhabitants, all of them Sunni Muslims arabs.

Akkas gas field
Akkas gas field  located in Al-Karabilah subdistrict. It was discovered in 1992, occupies approximately 30 km long and 12 km wide. Iraqi Oil Ministry estimated the reserves of Akkas at 5.6 trillion cubic feet.
In 2011, the Iraqi government signed a contract with Kogas to develop the gas field. According to the signed contract with the Iraq government, Kogas hold  75% of the shares while the rest of the shares went to Midland Oil Company.
All the development operations stopped due to terrorist attacks in 2014. Equipment, buildings, and other constructions have been looted or destroyed.

Current situation
The subdistrict fell into ISIL's hands after intensive clashes between ISIL's troop on one side and Iraqi security forces backed by tribesmen on the other side. Al-Karābilah was liberated from ISIL by the Iraqi government forces on October 28, 2017.

References

Subdistricts of Iraq
Populated places in Al Anbar Governorate